Robert Fletcher (3 July 1863 – 4 September 1918) was a New Zealand politician of the Liberal Party.

Early life and family
Fletcher was born in St Andrews, Fife, Scotland, on 3 July 1863, the son of David Fletcher and his wife Margaret Ann Duncan. After briefly working for the Midland Railway Company, he became a sailor for eight years with the Dundee Shipping Line, and arrived in New Zealand in 1883. He worked as a sailor in coastal shipping until 1885, when he became a pilot for the Wellington Harbour Board and, later, worked on the wharves. He was a prominent Freemason in Wellington.

Political career

Local-body politics
Fletcher was elected as a member of the Wellington Harbour Board in 1906, and held his seat until his death in 1918. He served as the board's chair between 1910 and 1915. From 1907 to 1915 he was also a member of the Wellington City Council. Fletcher contested the 1915 mayoralty contest, coming second to incumbent Mayor John Luke.

Member of Parliament

The 1911 general election required a second ballot if no candidate could achieve an absolute majority in the first round. The election was contested by Fisher (for the Reform Party), Fletcher, Tom Young (Labour Party) and Frank Freeman (Socialist Party), with Fisher having a majority of one vote over Fletcher. In the second ballot a week later, Fisher beat Fletcher with a majority of 150 votes. By the next general election in 1914, the incumbent Fisher as a government minister contested Wellington Central against Fletcher again, and he was decisively beaten by 2677 votes to 4910.

Fletcher represented Wellington Central in Parliament until 4 September 1918, when he died at his home in Wellington, having been in poor health for over a year. The by-election caused by his death was won by future Prime Minister Peter Fraser of the Labour Party.

References

1863 births
1918 deaths
People from St Andrews
Scottish emigrants to New Zealand
Wellington City Councillors
New Zealand Liberal Party MPs
New Zealand MPs for Wellington electorates
Unsuccessful candidates in the 1911 New Zealand general election
Members of the New Zealand House of Representatives
New Zealand Freemasons
Wellington Harbour Board members